Colonel Manvendra Singh Jasol (born 19 May 1964) is an Indian politician. He is a member of the Indian National Congress. He joined Congress on 17 October 2018. He was the member of the 14th Lok Sabha of India from 2004-2009 representing the Barmer-Jaisalmer constituency of Rajasthan and was considered an upcoming leader for BJP.

Early life
Colonel Manvendra Singh was born on 19 May 1964 in Jodhpur, Rajasthan. His father is Jaswant Singh, a former Finance Minister and Defence Minister of India, and mother is Sheetal Kanwar. Singh is married to Chitra Singh daughter of Bhainsrorgarh. They have two children. He is an alumnus of Mayo College and has an MA, having studied at Hampshire College, Amherst, Massachusetts and the School of Oriental and African Studies, London. He is a Colonel in Territorial Army (India). Before entering politics, he worked as a journalist at the Statesman and the Indian Express, with a specialization in defence and national security affairs. 

Singh worked as a media advisor for General Ved Prakash Malik during the Kargil War.

Political life
Though Singh entered politics in the late 90s. He lost his first Lok Sabha election in 1999 against Sona Ram of the Indian National Congress from Barmer-Jaisalmer constituency of Rajasthan. In 2004, he won the Lok Sabha election by 2,71,888 votes against Sona Ram from the same constituency. He represented Barmer-Jaisalmer constituency of Rajasthan in the 14th Lok Sabha, where he was a member of the Standing Committee on Defence. He had won from Shiv constituency as a candidate of Bharatiya Janata Party for Vidhan Sabha election, 2013 in Rajasthan. In 2014 he was suspended from BJP because of his campaign against BJP Lok Sabha candidate from his father's constituency. Just before 2018 Rajasthan Legislative Assembly elections he quit BJP to join Indian National Congress.

Career 
He was elected for 14th Lok Sabha from Barmer-Jaisalmer constituency of Rajasthan. Singh was a member of the Standing Committee on Defence, in the government of Manmohan Singh. He is a Member of Legislative Assembly (India) from Shiv constituency for Rajasthan Legislative Assembly.

Books

 Till Memory Serves: Victoria Cross Winners of India, 2007
 Campaign Diary: Chronicle of an Election Fought and Lost, 2013

References

External links 
ManvendraSingh

Manvendra Singh Blog

1964 births
Indian newspaper journalists
Rajasthani politicians
Indian National Congress politicians from Rajasthan
Living people
India MPs 2004–2009
People from Barmer, Rajasthan
Mayo College alumni
Lok Sabha members from Rajasthan
Members of Parliament from Barmer
Indian Army officers
Rajasthan MLAs 2013–2018
Jaswant Singh
Indian football executives